Skylark is an album by American jazz saxophonist Paul Desmond featuring Gábor Szabó recorded in 1973 and released on the CTI label.

Reception
The Allmusic review by Richard S. Ginell awarded the album 3 stars and stated "Paul Desmond injects a bit of the 1970s into his sound, obtaining agreeable if not totally simpatico results... It's a cautious change of pace for Desmond, although the fiercer context into which he was placed doesn't really fire his imagination".

Track listing
 "Take Ten" (Paul Desmond) - 6:08 
 "Romance de Amor" (Traditional) - 9:40 
 "Was a Sunny Day" (Paul Simon) - 4:52 
 "Music for a While" (Henry Purcell) - 6:45 
 "Skylark" (Hoagy Carmichael, Johnny Mercer) - 5:21 
 "Indian Summer" (Al Dubin, Victor Herbert) - 4:00 
 "Music for a While" [alternate take] (Purcell) - 5:56 Bonus track on CD reissue 
 "Skylark"  [alternate take] (Carmichael, Mercer) - 5:39 Bonus track on CD reissue 
 "Indian Summer"  [alternate take] (Dubin, Herbert) - 5:27 Bonus track on CD reissue  
Recorded at Van Gelder Studio in Englewood Cliffs, New Jersey on November 27–28 and December 4, 1973

Personnel
From the original liner notes.
Paul Desmond - alto saxophone
Bob James - piano, electric piano
Gene Bertoncini - guitar
Gábor Szabó - guitar (all solos)
Ron Carter - bass
Jack DeJohnette - drums
Ralph MacDonald - percussion
George Ricci - cello
Don Sebesky - arranger
Rudy Van Gelder - recording engineer

References

CTI Records albums
Paul Desmond albums
1974 albums
Albums produced by Creed Taylor
Albums arranged by Don Sebesky
Albums recorded at Van Gelder Studio